Audrey Langworthy (born April 1, 1934) is an American politician who served in the Kansas Senate from the 7th district from 1985 to 2001.

Langworthy attended the University of Kansas. Before her time in the Kansas Senate, Langworthy was elected as a city council member. In the Senate, Langworthy defeated and replaced longtime Kansas Senator Norman Gaar, who had been in the chamber since 1965. She self-identified as a moderate Republican, and unlike more conservative members of her party she took a pro-choice stance on abortion, which was a hotly contested issue in Kansas during her time in the Senate. She declined to run for re-election in 2000.

References

1934 births
Living people
Republican Party Kansas state senators
University of Kansas alumni
20th-century American politicians
20th-century American women politicians
Women state legislators in Kansas
People from Johnson County, Kansas
Women city councillors in Kansas
Politicians from Grand Forks, North Dakota